Sta. Ursula Parish is a 224-year-old church located in the heart of Binangonan, Rizal in the Philippines. It belongs to the Roman Catholic Diocese of Antipolo. It is also among the seven Jubilee churches of the Diocese of Antipolo.

History

By the year 1571–1602, the municipality of Binangonan was founded by Spanish missionaries. It was only a part of Morong at that time, but on 1621, it was separated. The Spanish missionaries then decided to create an independent parish and they chose St. Ursula as their patron. 

The parish of Binangonan was founded in 1621. In 1679, its administration was handed over to the Jesuits, who in 1697 transferred administration to the Augustinians. In 1737, Binangonan returned to the administration of the Franciscans who had founded it in the first place. The church was built from 1792 to 1800, renovated in 1853. At the same time, the adjacent convento was rebuilt, under Fr. Francisco de Paula Gomez.

Schedule of Services

Masses:

Monday to Saturday: 6:00 am and 6:00 pm
Sunday: 5:00 am, 6:30 am, 8:00 am, 9:30 am, 4:30 pm, 6:00 pm and 7:30 pm

Baptism:

Sunday: 10:30 am

Weddings:

Tuesday - Saturday: 7:30 am, 9:00 am, 10:30 am, 2:00 pm and 3:30 pm

Funeral Mass:

Tuesday - Friday: 1:30 pm
Sunday: 1:30 pm

Every 1st Sunday of the month - Parish Pastoral Council Meeting

References

Roman Catholic churches in Rizal
Churches in the Roman Catholic Diocese of Antipolo